Sărata is a commune in Bacău County, Western Moldavia, Romania. It is composed of two villages, Bălțata and Sărata. These were part of Nicolae Bălcescu Commune until 2004, when they were split off. At the 2011 census, 99.8% of inhabitants were ethnic Romanians.

References

Communes in Bacău County
Localities in Western Moldavia